The Makkah Chamber of Commerce & Industry (MCCI) is a semi-government organization that regulates and serves the business community in Makkah. The MCCI was established by a royal decree dated January 1947.

The MCCI opened their own building in 2013.

References 

Chambers of commerce
Business organisations based in Saudi Arabia